Bryan Walker may refer to:

Bryan Walker of Team Apache
Bryan Walker (baseball) in 1983–84 New York Rangers season

See also
Brian Walker (disambiguation)